The Deming Headlight is a newspaper in Deming, New Mexico, United States. It was founded by J.E. Curren with its first edition published June 25, 1881.

In his autobiography, Miguel Antonio Otero, the Governor of the New Mexico Territory from 1897 to 1906, described it as a Democratic paper unfavourable to the Republican Party. 

Through 1948 it was published weekly except for a period from September 1883 to June 1886 when it was published daily in order to compete with the Deming Tribune and Lake Valley Herald before returning to weekly after the Tribune folded.Curren traded the paper for the Kingston Clipper and left for Sierra County in 1884.

From 1949 to 1956, the Deming Headlight and the Deming Graphic were consolidated under single ownership and both continued to be published on Tuesdays and Fridays until the publications separated again in 1956 under publisher David Watson.

In the late 20th century the Headlight was owned by MediaNews Group, and described on its masthead as "an edition of the Las Cruces Sun-News". It was part of the Texas-New Mexico Newspaper Partnership between MediaNews and Gannett. In 2015, Gannett acquired full ownership of the Texas-New Mexico Newspapers Partnership.

The Headlight published daily from 1978 until April 2017, after publisher Rynni Henderson announced that the Headlight would reduce its print edition from five to two issues weekly, publishing on Wednesdays and Fridays, as part of a "digital first approach" emphasizing internet publication. The change in schedule took effect in April of that year.

On November 1, 2022, the Headlight was purchased from Gannett by Nickolas Seibel, publisher of the Silver City Daily Press and Silver City Independent. It continued to publish on Wednesdays and Fridays with a news staff of two local reporters.

References

External links
 Official website

Newspapers published in New Mexico
Gannett publications